The Stamford Bridge Pensioners were a speedway team which operated from 1929 until their closure in 1932.

History
The team were one of the pioneers of British speedway, entering and winning the first Southern League championship in 1929. The stadium was, and still is, the home to Chelsea F.C. The track was made from black cinders and was also used as an athletics track, and after speedway finished it was used as a greyhound racing track.

The team became the first champions of the United Kingdom alongside Leeds Lions of the Northern League, when they won the 1929 Speedway Southern League.

Notable riders

Season summary

References

Defunct British speedway teams
Speedway teams in London